is a public university in Ueda, Nagano, Japan, established in 1966. A private university when founded, it became a public university in 2017.

References

External links
 Official website 

Educational institutions established in 1966
Public universities in Japan
Universities and colleges in Nagano Prefecture
1966 establishments in Japan
Ueda, Nagano